William Henri Woode (September 25, 1909 – May 31, 1994) was an American composer, lyricist, arranger, and singer. His compositions include A Night at the Vanguard, Sweet Slumber, You Taught Me to Love Again, and the jazz standard Broadway popularized by the Count Basie Orchestra. Woode and his orchestra starred in the 1946 featurette film Love in Syncopation.

References

20th-century American composers
1909 births
1994 deaths
American jazz composers
American male jazz composers
20th-century American male musicians
20th-century jazz composers